Kālonaiki (Hawaiian pronunciation: Kah-loh-nah-eeh-keeh) was a High Chief of the island of Oahu in ancient Hawaii, a successor of his relative, the High Chief Maʻilikākahi. He is mentioned in ancient chants as the second ruler from the House of Maʻilikākahi, and was a descendant of the Chiefess Maelo of Kona. Through him, his descendants claimed the legendary Nana-Ula as an ancestor.

Family 
The genealogy of Kālonaikiʻs is given in Hawaiian chants, but there are different opinions on the fact who were his parents. According to one opinion, he was a son of his predecessor Maʻilikākahi (and his consort, Kanepukoa?), but it is generally believed that he was actually Maʻilikākahiʻs grandson, a son of Maʻilikākahiʻs son Kālonanui and his wife Kaipuholua, and thus a brother of the High Chief Kalamakua of Halawa.

Kālonaiki had married a woman known as Kikenui-a-ʻEwa (or Kikinui-a-ʻEwa); her genealogy is unknown, but it is believed that she was a descendant of the High Chief ʻEwaulialaakona. She bore (three?) children to Kālonaiki:
High Chief Piliwale of Oʻahu
Paʻakanilea?
Lō-Lale

See also 

Alii nui of Oahu

References 

Royalty of Oahu
Year of death unknown